Seifenbach may refer to:

Seifenbach (Salzbach), a river of Hesse, Germany, tributary of the Salzbach
Seifenbach (Schwarzwasser), a river of Hesse, Germany, tributary of the Schwarzwasser